Jonathan Pienaar (born 16 September 1962) is a South African writer, actor, voice-over artist and comedian who has been active for over 20 years. He has appeared in both South African and international films and television shows including Skin, Black Venus, Fried Barry, and To the Ends of the Earth, Cape Town, Troy: Fall of a City, and Deutschland 86.

Early life
Pienaar attended high school at the Marist Brothers College (now Sacred Heart College) in Observatory, Johannesburg. He took a drama course at Technikon Pretoria.

Filmography

Film

Television

Stage

Awards and nominations

References

External links

Jonathan Pienaar at TVSA

Living people
1962 births
20th-century South African male actors
21st-century South African male actors
South African male comedians
South African male film actors
South African male voice actors
South African male writers